Doondeswara Rao Pothina (9 June 1932 – 1 January 2007), more popularly known as Doondi, was an Indian film producer. He was described as one of the pioneer film personalities of the 1960s Telugu film industry. Doondi produced and directed about 29 films in Telugu, Kannada, and Hindi. In 2005, he also served as the Nandi Awards Committee Chairman.

Early life
Doondeswara was born into an affluent family, the son of Pothina Srinivasa Rao and his wife Achchaayyamma. His father had built Maruthi Talkies, which was the very first cinema theatre to open in the territory which is now the state of Andhra Pradesh. Doondi's elder brother, Surendranath Benarjee, who was incidentally a classmate of NTR, used to look after the family's movie business (Maruthi Talkies & Srinivasa Mahal). He also kept close relations with film personalities in Madras through his Maruti Talkies connections.

Doondi attended the Rishi Valley School and Madras Christian College, where he was known for his keen interest in films.

Film career
In 1955, Doondi visited the famous Vauhini Studios in Chennai. Following the advice of B. Nagi Reddy of Vauhini Studios, Doondi successfully dubbed a Tamil film into Telugu, and the Telugu version was released as Kondaveeti Donga in 1958. This movie was an unprecedented hit and remains a much-loved classic to this day. Following this initial success, Doondi was offered a business partnership with Sunderlal Nahata, the father of film producer Srikant Nahata and father-in-law of actress Jaya Prada.

Doondi co-produced Jayam Manade with N. T. Rama Rao in 1956. He later made the story of the Super hit Film, Shanti Nivasam in 1960 with ANR, based on the Hindi film "Aaina". While this film was being made, disputes arose between Doondi and director C.S. Rao. Sundarlal Nahata sided with Rao. Later, Doondi produced the films Sabash Ramudu, Bandipotu, and Gudi Gantalu with N. T. Rama Rao.

In 1963, he re-made the film Bandipotu] in Kannada as Veera Kesari, starring Rajkumar under the direction of B. Vittalacharya.

Doondi also produced the Telugu films as Khaidi Kannayya (1962) and Gooduputani (1972). Doondi introduced the famous writer and director, Mullapudi Venkata Ramana, with the writing credentials of Rakta Sambandham (Savitri (actress) & N. T. Rama Rao) in 1962. His Veerabhimanyu introducing Sobhan Babu as Hero & Kanchana (actress) as Heroine, was successful both in Telugu and Tamil Film Industry. Doondi also made Gudachari 116 with Super Star Krishna (Telugu actor) which earned him levels of fame. Later, MGR Made the Same in Tamil "Ragasiya Police 115" suggested by Jayalalithaa. (who acted the same in Telugu With Krishna.) Doondi is also recognised as one of the people who brought the spy genre to the Telugu film industry.

Doondi made Chelleli Kosam in 1968 and Aasthulu Anthasthulu in 1969 with Krishna.

He later produced films under the banner of Trimurthy Productions along with his cousin Babji. These films include Bhale Dongalu, Dongala Veta and "Marapurani Katha"

He was considered a leader in adapting south Indian movies for Hindi audiences. Along with Sundarlal Nahata, he produced Farz in 1967, introducing Ravikant Nagaich as a director and served as a stepping stone to success for Jeetendra. This was again a remake of the Super Hit Telugu Film, Gudachari 116. This film was a significant box office success and supposedly made Jeetendra a popular Hero. Doondi produced Pyar Ki Kahani in 1971 which gave breakthrough to Amithab bachan, a remake of the Tamil Film, Kai Koduttha Dheivam, starring Sivaji Ganesan and Savitri (actress) In 1969. Doondi, along with Sunderlal Nahata, produced Jigri Dost with Jeetendra in a dual role, which was a remake of MGR's Matukara Velan. He produced Sahhas in 1981 with Mithun Chakraborty and Rati Agnihotri under the direction of Ravikant Nagaich.

When Gulzar narrated the story of Mausam along with Mallikarjuna Rao, they started the shooting immediately, and the film won the National Awards for Best Actress and Best Film, under the banner of Sunandini Pictures.

Doondi was a presenter of films such as Himmat in 1970, Keemat in 1973. Ratha Chakralu was Doondi's last credited film prior to his death in 2007.

Doondi also directed films such as Abhimanavati (1975) in Telugu, Adha Din Aadhi Raat in Hindi. 
Recognizing his increasing age and a changing business, Doondi retired from the film industry. Upon his retirement, Doondi lamented the effects of commercial demands on modern cinema and hoped that small producers would continue to lead the film industry. By then, Doondi had somewhat earned a reputation as a shrewd director with a critical eye for films.

Death
On 1 January 2007, Doondeswara died from cancer at the age of 74 in Visakhapatnam. He is survived by his wife, two daughters and two sons.

References

1932 births
2007 deaths
Film producers from Andhra Pradesh